Wapping Hockey Club is a field hockey club in the East End of London in the London Borough of Tower Hamlets. The home grounds are the national stadium for English Hockey, the Lee Valley Hockey and Tennis Centre at the Queen Elizabeth Olympic Park, where there are two international standard water-based pitches and the John Orwell Centre in Wapping.  The club fields a total of 23 sides including 11 men's and 8 ladies' sides covering a wide range of abilities.

Olympic Legacy
The club was founded in 1988 off the back of the Great Britain men's field hockey team's success at the Seoul Olympics of the same year. 
The club secured anchor tenancy at the London 2012 legacy facility following its opening as Lee Valley Hockey and Tennis Centre in June 2014. The facility hosted the 2015 EuroHockey Nations Championships.
In 2014, the club secured over £300,000 of investment to designate its base at John Orwell Sports Centre in Wapping a hockey priority facility. By 2016, approximately £650,000  had been invested in the refurbishment, meaning among other things, both Wapping HC grounds have covered spectator seating. The refurbishment allowed the creation of an affiliated youth club, Wapping Kidds HC, in January 2016. In September 2019, the first youth players made their debut in the adult club.

External links
Wapping Hockey Club Official website
Wapping Hockey Club Facebook page
England Hockey website
East Region Hockey website
Lee Valley Hockey and Tennis Centre website

References

English field hockey clubs
Field hockey clubs established in 1988
1988 establishments in England
Sports clubs in London
Sport in the London Borough of Tower Hamlets
Field hockey in London